Battery or batterie most often refers to:

 Electric battery, a device that provides electrical power
 Battery (crime), a crime involving unlawful physical contact

Battery may also refer to:

Energy source 
Automotive battery, a device to provide power to certain functions of an automobile
List of battery types
Energy storage, including batteries that are not electrochemical

Law 
 Battery (tort), a civil wrong in common law of intentional harmful or offensive contact

Military and naval uses 
 Artillery battery, an organized group of artillery pieces
 Main battery, the primary weapons of a warship
 Secondary battery (artillery), the smaller guns on a warship
 Battery, a position of a cartridge in a firearm action

Arts and entertainment

Music
 Battery (electro-industrial band)
 Battery (hardcore punk band)
 "Battery", a song by Metallica from the 1986 album Master of Puppets
 Drums, which have historically been grouped into ensembles called a battery 
 Drumline, the marching percussion section of a marching ensemble
 Percussion section, of an orchestra or wind ensemble
 
 Battery, a software music sampler by Native Instruments

Other uses in arts and entertainment
 Battery (chess), a playing tactic
 Battery (novel series), by Atsuko Asano
 Battery Records (disambiguation), the name of several record labels
 The Battery (disambiguation)#Films, the name of two films

Places
 The Battery (Manhattan), or Battery Park, New York, U.S.
 The Battery (disambiguation)#Places, the name of several places
 Battery Island, Tasmania, Australia
 Battery Park (disambiguation), the name of several places
 Battery Point, Tasmania, Australia

Other uses
 Battery (baseball), the pitcher and catcher collectively
 Battery, or stamp mill, a type of mill
 Battery (drink), a brand of energy drinks in Finland
 Battery Ventures, an investment firm
 Stamp Battery, a type of mill machine that crushes material by pounding rather than grinding

See also

 Battery Building, the Simmons Hardware Company Warehouse in Sioux City, Iowa, U.S.
 Battery cage, a confinement system for egg-laying chickens (battery hens)